Persephone is a fictional character in The Matrix franchise. She is portrayed by Monica Bellucci. In the films The Matrix Reloaded and The Matrix Revolutions, Persephone is the wife of the Merovingian. She seems bored with her existence in the Matrix, and is dissatisfied with her husband (possibly because of his constant infidelities).

Films
In The Matrix Reloaded, Persephone meets Neo, Trinity and Morpheus when they come to talk with The Merovingian, her husband. Though her husband declines to help the human resistance, Persephone is sexually attracted to Neo and offers to help him if he kisses her with the same passion with which he has kissed Trinity. Reluctantly, he complies and she helps him free the Keymaker. Later, she kills one of her husband's employees.

In The Matrix Revolutions, Persephone warns the Merovingian that Trinity would indeed kill everyone in Club Hel to free Neo from the Train Station, simply because she is in love. This suggests that Persephone perceives and understands love, and may be disheartened by the cynicism of her husband, who seems to be driven solely by greed and lust.

In The Matrix Resurrections, Persephone makes a quick cameo appearance through archive footage from Reloaded while Neo remembers his past adventures sixty years after bringing peace to humans and Machines. While the Merovingian and some of his henchmen are revealed to have survived The Analyst's purge over the Matrix, Persephone's status is unconfirmed.

Enter the Matrix
In the video game Enter The Matrix, Persephone encounters and takes a kiss from either Niobe or Ghost (depending on whose story the player follows). She seems to be able to deduce the feelings and emotions of those she kisses, noting Niobe's love for Morpheus, or Ghost's unrequited love for Trinity. She apparently takes deep pleasure in sampling the emotions of others.

The Matrix Online
In the MMO The Matrix Online, Persephone gave the location of the Assassin's hide-out to Zion operatives in a critical mission relating to the Death Of A Destroyer event.

Cultural references
The character's name is taken from that of Persephone in Greek mythology, who is the daughter of Zeus and Demeter (Ceres), and whom Hades took to the underworld to be his queen.

Before shooting her husband's employee in The Matrix Reloaded, Persephone wonders aloud, "How many people keep silver bullets in their gun?", implying that the employee is a werewolf. In behind-the-scenes footage, Persephone herself is compared to a "vampire that seeks after emotions" by actress Monica Bellucci.

In popular culture
In a 2012 survey by Empire Cinemas, Persephone was listed among the sexiest characters in cinema.

Likewise, Nettavisen declared in 2009 that the role of Persephone qualified Monica Bellucci as one of the 25 sexiest women of all time.

See also
Simulated reality

References

External links 
Persephone in The Matrix Reloaded, Guardian Film

The Matrix (franchise) characters
Fictional artificial intelligences
Film characters introduced in 2003
Fictional socialites
Fictional bisexual females
Fictional empaths
Fictional women soldiers and warriors